The Men's 800 metres at the 2011 World Championships in Athletics was held at the Daegu Stadium on August 27, 28 and 30.

The first semi-final went out fast, with a bunch finish.  While Abubaker Kaki came into the event as one of the favorites, he had to qualify to the final by time as the fastest 3rd place.  Both time qualifiers came from the first semi.  The second semi was the opposite kind of race as kickers Nick Symmonds and Yuriy Borzakovskiy almost acted as a team to run from the front and slow the pace.  The two almost formed a wall down the home stretch that frustrated the runners behind them, achieving the two slowest qualifying times into the final.  The third semi final was favorite David Rudisha taking control of the race, only accelerating enough to make sure nobody passed him.

Rudisha won the gold medal after leading the race from the start.  Behind him through most of the last lap, surprisingly was come from behind specialist Borzakovskiy, who was himself out-kicked by Kaki just before the finish for the silver medal.

Medalists

Records
Prior to the competition, the following records were as follows.

Qualification standards

Schedule

Results

Heats
Qualification: First 3 in each heat (Q) and the next 6 fastest (q) advance to the semifinals.

Semifinals
Qualification: First 2 in each heat (Q) and the next 2 fastest (q) advance to the Final.

Final

References

External links
800 metres results at IAAF website

800
800 metres at the World Athletics Championships